Devarapalle or Devarapalli may refer to :

 Devarapalle, West Godavari district
 Devarapalle, Visakhapatnam district